Frisky Tom is a 1981 arcade game by Nichibutsu. 

A Bandai Electronics VFD handheld version of Frisky Tom was released in 1982. A version for the Atari 5200 was programmed in 1983, but never published. Much later, ports of Frisky Tom were published  for the Nintendo Game Boy (in 1995)  then the PlayStation (in 2002).

Gameplay
Controls consist of a single four-position joystick. The player assumes the role of a plumber, Tom, tasked with protecting and maintaining a network of plumbing pipes that route water from a storage tank to a shower. Three different types of mice attempt to disrupt the water flow by knocking joints loose to cause leaks and by setting/igniting a bomb to blow up the tank. Tom must pick up the dropped joints, climb the pipes to fit them back in place, and extinguish the bomb before its fuse burns all the way down. Yellow mice can be safely knocked off the pipes, but they turn purple and become dangerous after dislodging a joint, occasionally jumping off the pipes in an attempt to hit Tom. White mice attempt to light the fuse on the bomb.

The water level in the tank steadily decreases over time, and each level ends once it is empty. A bonus counter decreases whenever water is leaking out of the pipes instead of flowing to the shower; at the end of the level, any remaining bonus is added to the player's score.

One life is lost whenever Tom touches a purple mouse or the bomb explodes. The game ends after all lives are lost.

Reception
Famicom Tsūshin scored the Game Boy version of the game a 19 out of 40.

References

External links

1981 video games
Arcade video games
Cancelled Atari 5200 games
Game Boy games
Nintendo Switch games
PlayStation (console) games
PlayStation Network games
PlayStation 4 games
Nihon Bussan games
Video games developed in Japan

Japan-exclusive video games
Hamster Corporation games